The 2000–01 FIBA Saporta Cup was the thirty-fifth edition of FIBA's 2nd-tier level European-wide professional club basketball competition. It occurred between October 17, 2000, and April 17, 2001. The final was held at Hala Torwar, Warsaw, Poland.

Competition system
 24 teams (national domestic cup champions, plus the best qualified teams in the most important European national domestic leagues), entered a preliminary group stage, divided into four groups of six teams each, playing a round-robin. The final standing were based on individual wins and defeats. In case of a tie between two or more teams, after the group stage, the following criteria were used to decide the final classification: 1) number of wins in one-to-one games between the teams; 2) basket average between the teams; 3) general basket average within the group.
 The top four teams from each group qualified for a 1/8 Final Playoff (X-pairings, home and away games), while the winners advanced further to 1/4 Finals and 1/2 Finals.
 The Final was played at a predetermined venue.

Team allocation 
The labels in the parentheses show how each team qualified for the place of its starting round:

 1st, 2nd, 3rd, 4th, 5th, etc.: League position after eventual Playoffs
 CW: Cup winners

*As a substitute for Olimpia Milano which team withdrew from competition

Regular season

Group A

Group B

Group C

Group D

Top 16

|}

* Aris didn't play the second leg because its players were on strike for not getting their salaries and Maroussi received a forfeit (20–0) in this game.

** The original second leg was suspended after several players of Telindus Racing Antwerpen and Crvena zvezda were disqualified. Later, FIBA decided that his game should be replayed a week later behind closed doors to avoid further incidents, but the Yugoslavian team didn't show up for the match and Telindus received a forfeit (20–0).

Quarterfinals

|}

Semifinals

|}

Final
April 17, Hala Torwar, Warsaw

|}

Awards

FIBA Saporta Cup Finals MVP 
 Jimmy Oliver ( Maroussi)

See also
2000–01 Euroleague
2000–01 FIBA SuproLeague
2000–01 FIBA Korać Cup

References

External links
  2000–01 FIBA Saporta Cup @ FIBA Europe.com
 2000–01 FIBA Saporta Cup at Linguasport

Saporta
2000–01